Robert Meyer (11 January 1864, in Hanover – 12 December 1947, in Minneapolis) was a German pathologist.

He studied medicine at the universities of Leipzig, Heidelberg and Strassburg, receiving his doctorate at the latter institution in 1889. From 1890 to 1894 he was a medical practitioner in the community of Dedeleben, and afterwards worked as assistant to gynecologist Johann Veit in Berlin.

From 1909 to 1911 he was head of the laboratory in the women's clinic at the Berlin Charité, and in 1912 succeeded Carl Arnold Ruge as chief of the pathological institute of the university women's clinic. In 1932 he became an honorary professor to the faculty of medicine at the university. Because of his Jewish ancestry, he was removed from his position at Berlin in 1935. Subsequently, he emigrated to the United States, settling in Minneapolis in 1939.

He is remembered for his research involving the embryology and histopathology of the reproductive system. He held a particular interest in embryonic tissue anomalies. Within the field of urology, the "Weigert-Meyer law" is named; a rule concerning the anatomical relationship of the two ureters. It is named in conjunction with pathologist Carl Weigert.

Associated works 
 Über epitheliale Gebilde im Myometrium des fötalen und kindlichen Uterus, 1899.
 Studien zur Pathologie der Entwicklung, with Ernst Schwalbe (2 volumes 1914–20).
 "Autobiography of Dr. Robert Meyer (1864-1947); a short abstract of a long life". With a memoir of Dr. Meyer by Emil Novak, 1949.

References 

1864 births
1947 deaths
Physicians from Hanover
Academic staff of the Humboldt University of Berlin
University of Strasbourg alumni
German gynaecologists
German pathologists
German histologists
German embryologists
Jewish emigrants from Nazi Germany to the United States